Marsalis Music is a jazz record label founded by Branford Marsalis in 2002.

After 20 years with Columbia, saxophonist Branford Marsalis left to start his own label. Early musicians to the label included Miguel Zenón, a Puerto Rican saxophonist, Doug Wamble, a guitarist from Tennessee, and Harry Connick Jr., who, like the Marsalis family, is from New Orleans.

The catalogue includes The Marsalis Family: A Jazz Celebration, and Music Redeems, the only recorded performances of the father and sons together (father Ellis with sons Branford, Wynton, Delfeayo, and Jason). The catalogue also includes  Romare Bearden Revealed, a tribute to the visual artist created in conjunction with a traveling exhibition of his work curated by the National Gallery of Art in Washington, D.C.

In 2006, the label inaugurated the Honors Series to pay tribute to underappreciated musicians. The series has featured Michael Carvin, Jimmy Cobb, Bob French, and Alvin Batiste.

Marsalis Music receives distribution and marketing support worldwide from Okeh Records.

Roster
Harry Connick, Jr.
Branford Marsalis
Branford Marsalis Quartet
The Marsalis Family
Miguel Zenón
Joey Calderazzo
Doug Wamble
Claudia Acuña

Honors Series Artists
Alvin Batiste
Michael Carvin
Jimmy Cobb
Bob French

Discography
Footsteps of Our Fathers (2002) – Branford Marsalis
Marsalis Family: A Jazz Celebration (2003) – The Marsalis Family
Marsalis Family: A Jazz Celebration (2003) (DVD) – The Marsalis Family
Country Libations (2003) – Doug Wamble
Romare Bearden Revealed (2003) – Branford Marsalis
Other Hours (2003) – Harry Connick Jr.
Ceremonial (2004) – Miguel Zenón
Haiku (2004) – Joey Calderazzo
Eternal (2004) – Branford Marsalis
Coltrane's A Love Supreme Live (2004) (DVD) – Branford Marsalis
Bluestate (2005) – Doug Wamble
Jíbaro (2005) – Miguel Zenón
Occasion (2005) – Harry Connick Jr.
A Duo Occasion (2005) (DVD) – Harry Connick Jr. & Branford Marsalis
Marsalis Music Honors Series: Michael Carvin (2006) – Michael Carvin
Marsalis Music Honors Series: Jimmy Cobb (2006) – Jimmy Cobb
Braggtown (2006) – Branford Marsalis Quartet
Chanson du Vieux Carré (2007) – Harry Connick Jr.
Marsalis Music Honors Series: Alvin Batiste (2007) – Alvin Batiste
Marsalis Music Honors Series: Bob French (2007) – Bob French
Amanecer (2007) – Joey Calderazzo
Awake (2008) – Miguel Zenón
Metamorphosen (2009) – Branford Marsalis Quartet
En Este Momento (2009) – Claudia Acuña
Esta Plena (2009) – Miguel Zenón
Music Redeems (2010) – The Marsalis Family
Songs of Mirth and Melancholy (2011) – Branford Marsalis and Joey Calderazzo
Alma Adentro: The Puerto Rican Songbook (2011) – Miguel Zenón
Music from The Happy Elf: Connick On Piano, Vol. 4 (2011) – Harry Connick Jr.
Four MFs Playin' Tunes (2012) (CD and Vinyl) – Branford Marsalis Quartet
In My Solitude: Live at Grace Cathedral (2014) (CD and Vinyl via Okeh Records) – Branford Marsalis
Upward Spiral (2016) (CD and Vinyl via Okeh Records) – Branford Marsalis Quartet with special guest Kurt Elling

See also 
 List of record labels

References

External links
 Official site
 

American record labels
Jazz record labels
Vanity record labels
Companies based in Cambridge, Massachusetts
Marsalis family